Tesoro Corporation, known briefly as Andeavor, was a Fortune 100 and a Fortune Global 500 company headquartered in San Antonio, Texas, with 2017 annual revenues of $35 billion, and over 14,000 employees worldwide. Based on 2017 revenue, the company ranked No. 90 in the 2018 Fortune 500 list of the largest United States corporations by total revenue.

Tesoro's retail-marketing system included approx. 3,000 branded retail gas stations, of which more than 595 were company-operated under its own Tesoro brandname, as well as Shell, ExxonMobil, ARCO, and USA Gasoline brands.

Tesoro, known at the time as Andeavor, was acquired by Marathon Petroleum on October 1, 2018.

History

Tesoro was founded in 1968 by Dr. Robert V. West Jr, and was primarily engaged in petroleum exploration and production. Tesoro is the word for treasure (or treasury) in Italian and Spanish. In 1969, Tesoro began operating its first refinery, near Kenai, Alaska. Tesoro became the first Fortune 500 company to be headquartered in San Antonio, Texas.

Beginning in the late 1990s, Tesoro grew through a series of acquisitions and initiatives that created Tesoro Corporation, the company focusing on a single core business: petroleum refining, and marketing and distribution. The first segment involved the operation of six petroleum refineries situated in California, Alaska, Washington, Hawaii, North Dakota, and Utah. For its marketing and distribution segment, Tesoro sells refined gas and fuel products in both bulk and wholesale markets.

Prior to its acquisition by Marathon Petroleum in 2018, Tesoro was the third-largest independent petroleum refining and marketing company in the United States. The merger between the two companies created the largest American refiner by capacity and the fifth in the world. 

Milestones in the company's history are:

 1998: acquires second refinery (after Nikiski) in Kapolei, Hawaii along with petroleum terminals and approximately 30 retail stations in Hawaii from BHP Americas - also acquires the former Shell refinery at Anacortes, Washington;
 1999:	sold exploration and production operations;
 2001:	purchased refineries in Mandan, North Dakota, and Salt Lake City, Utah from BP Amoco;
 2002: acquired Golden Eagle Refinery in Martinez, California from Ultramar (Valero);
 2003: sold Tesoro Marine Services to Martin Midstream: Tesoro Marine Services were operating fueling and supply terminals servicing US Gulf Coast oil and gas exploration - also made a series of refinery acquisitions that boosted the company's capacity output and positioned it for future expansion in key growth markets throughout the Western United States;
 2005:	largest capital expansion program in the corporation's history and record earnings;
 2007: announcement of purchase of Shell's refinery at Los Angeles refinery and approximately 250 Southern California retail stations;
 2007: Tesoro acquires USA Gasoline;
 2009: Tesoro employees move into a newly completed corporate campus in July.
 2011: Tesoro forms Tesoro Logistics LP (TLLP) as a master limited partnership;
 2011: Tesoro acquires 250 ARCO (Thrifty Style Stations) and Thrifty Stations in Southern California;
 2012: Tesoro changes the 250 ARCO (Thrifty Style Stations) and Thrifty Stations in Southern California to USA Gasoline;
 2013: Tesoro purchases the Carson refinery and the ARCO brand from BP;
 2013: Tesoro sells its Kapolei refinery to Par Petroleum (now Par Pacific Holdings).
 2016 Tesoro purchased Dakota Prairie Refining in Dickinson, North Dakota from WBI Energy. Construction of the refinery was completed in the spring of 2015.
 2016: Tesoro Corp has agreed to buy Western Refining for $4.1 billion.
 2016/17: Par Pacific Inc. rebrands its Tesoro and 76 gas stations as Hele.
2017: Tesoro announces that it will be changing its name to Andeavor following its acquisition of Western Refining. On August 1, 2017, the company changed its ticker symbol to "ANDV" from "TSO".
2018: Andeavor announces that they have entered into a definitive merger agreement with Marathon Petroleum under which Marathon Petroleum will acquire all of Andeavor's outstanding shares. The merger was closed on October 1.

Media controversy

Environmental record

following which the Environmental Protection Agency named Tesoro a potentially responsible party for at least four superfund toxic waste sites.
Tesoro has settled and/or closed each of the superfund sites for which it has been named as one of many responsible parties.  Tesoro was listed as a de minimis contributor to a superfund site in Abbeville, LA, and the site has since been closed by the EPA.

Tesoro has given over $1 million in support of California Proposition 23, which aimed to suspend the Global Warming Solutions Act of 2006.

Defenders of the Amazon forest in South America cite Tesoro for sourcing some of their crude oil from the Amazon. Three of Tesoro's refineries- Anacortes (WA), LA (CA) and Golden Eagle (CA), are known to process Amazonian crude oil.

Explosion

On April 2, 2010, an explosion at Tesoro's refinery in Anacortes, Washington killed seven workers.

Libya
After the overthrow of Colonel Gaddafi, Tesoro bought Libyan crude oil in early April 2011 from the Vitol Group to supply its then-Hawaiian refinery.

See also

 List of automotive fuel brands
 List of oil exploration and production companies

References

External links

1968 establishments in Texas
2018 mergers and acquisitions
American corporate subsidiaries
Companies based in San Antonio
Companies formerly listed on the New York Stock Exchange
Economy of the Western United States
Energy companies established in 1968
Marathon Petroleum
Non-renewable resource companies established in 1968
Oil companies of the United States
Petroleum in Texas